Heather Allison may refer to:

 Heather Allison (weightlifter), British weightlifter
 Heather MacAllister, pen name Heather Allison, American writer